Krap Yai is a tambon (subdistrict) of Ban Pong District, Ratchaburi Province, western Thailand.

History and presently
Krap Yai, especially at Huai Krabok is a largest Thai Chinese Hakka community in Thailand. It is said that over 100 years ago, there were mainland Chinese and villagers from neighbouring area Ban Lueak, Photharam District migrated to settle here.

Today, Thai Chinese Hakka Krap Yai also retain their form of lifestyle as in the past.

Geography
Krap Yai considered as a border town of three provinces, namely Ratchaburi, Nakhon Pathom, and Kanchanaburi.

Neighboring tambons are (from the north clockwise): Nong Lan of Tha Maka District, Kanchanaburi Province, Nong Ngu Lueam of Kamphaeng Saen and Mueang Nakhon Pathom Districts, Nakhon Pathom Province, Tha Pha and Pak Raet in its district, and Sanam Yae of Tha Maka District, Kanchanaburi Province.

Most of the area is loamy sand.

Economy
Sugarcane and corn are considered important industrial crops of this subdistrict.

Administration

Central administration
The tambon is subdivided into 10 administrative villages (muban).

Local administration
The area of the subdistrict is shared by two local governments.
The subdistrict municipality (Thesaban Tambon) Krap Yai (เทศบาลตำบลกรับใหญ่)
The subdistrict municipality (Thesaban Tambon) Huai Krabok (เทศบาลตำบลห้วยกระบอก)

Transport
Thailand Route 3394 is a main road.

Sights
In the north-west part of the subdistrict adjacent to the border of the three provinces. It is the location of Huai Krabok Market, the local marketplace and community of local Thai Chinese Hakka. It is surrounded by two storey traditional wooden shophouses. It has been restored to a pedestrian street that can walk between the three provinces in just five minutes, and still maintain its identity, whether it is faith, tradition, culture and food.

References

External links
Thaitambon.com on Krap Yai
Huai Krabok Municipality

Tambon of Ratchaburi Province